Peter Travis (born November 11, 1945) is a retired Canadian football player who played for the Edmonton Eskimos and BC Lions. He played college football at the University of Louisville.

References

1945 births
Living people
Edmonton Elks players